Pennsylvania State Senate District 32 includes part of Westmoreland County and all of Bedford County, Fayette County, and Somerset County. It is currently represented by Republican Patrick J. Stefano.

District profile
The district includes the following areas:

Senators

References

Pennsylvania Senate districts
Government of Fayette County, Pennsylvania
Government of Somerset County, Pennsylvania
Government of Westmoreland County, Pennsylvania